Marcinkowo may refer to:

Marcinkowo, Greater Poland Voivodeship (west-central Poland)
Marcinkowo, Inowrocław County in Kuyavian-Pomeranian Voivodeship (north-central Poland)
Marcinkowo, Mogilno County in Kuyavian-Pomeranian Voivodeship (north-central Poland)
Marcinkowo, Braniewo County in Warmian-Masurian Voivodeship (north Poland)
Marcinkowo, Mrągowo County in Warmian-Masurian Voivodeship (north Poland)
Marcinkowo, Olsztyn County in Warmian-Masurian Voivodeship (north Poland)
Marcinkowo, Ostróda County in Warmian-Masurian Voivodeship (north Poland)